The 2023 Ladies European Tour is a series of golf tournaments for elite female golfers from around the world. The tournaments are sanctioned by the Ladies European Tour (LET).

Changes for 2023

Purses
The prize money for the Aramco Saudi Ladies International underwent a significant five-fold increase from US$1m to US$5m, matching the men's Saudi International on the Asian Tour, making the purse the third largest on the LET, offering $750,000 to the tournament champion.

Tournaments
The Lalla Meryem Cup returned to the schedule after a three year hiatus due to the pandemic.

Schedule
The table below shows part of the 2023 schedule.

The numbers in brackets after the winners' names indicate the career wins on the Ladies European Tour, including that event, and is only shown for members of the tour.

Key

Unofficial events
The following team events appear on the schedule, but do not carry ranking points.

See also
2023 LPGA Tour
2023 LET Access Series

References

External links
Official site of the Ladies European Tour
2023 Ladies European Tour Tournaments

2023
2023 in women's golf
2023 in European sport
Current golf seasons